The 2016 Audi Cup of China was the fifth event of six in the 2016–17 ISU Grand Prix of Figure Skating, a senior-level international invitational competition series. It was held at the Capital Gymnasium in Beijing on November 18–20. Medals were awarded in the disciplines of men's singles, ladies' singles, pair skating, and ice dancing. Skaters earned points toward qualifying for the 2016–17 Grand Prix Final.

Entries
The ISU published the preliminary assignments on June 30, 2016.

Changes to initial assignments

Results

Men

Ladies

Pairs

Ice dancing

References

External links
 2016 Cup of China at the International Skating Union

Cup of China
Cup of China
Cup of China
Sports competitions in Beijing
2010s in Beijing